The Herald Times Reporter is a daily newspaper based in Manitowoc, Wisconsin and owned by Gannett as part of its USA Today Network Wisconsin division. The newspaper is distributed primarily throughout Manitowoc County, as Green Bay and Sheboygan have their own Gannett newspapers (and often the HTR itself duplicates the front page of the Press on certain days). The newspaper is associated with the Lakeshore Chronicle, a free newspaper circulated on Wednesdays and Sundays which contains "best-of" content from the HTR and circulars.

History
The first newspaper in Manitowoc began in November 1850 when a newspaper press was brought on a schooner from Milwaukee. A weekly newspaper called the Weekly Press was printed; it was renamed the Weekly Herald in 1955. In 1898, the Weekly Herald became a daily newspaper; the Herald-Press Publishing Company was formed and it printed the Daily Herald and Weekly Press. The Weekly Press was absorbed into the Daily Herald in 1953 and the newspaper became known as the Herald Times. It purchased the Two Rivers Reporter based in nearby Two Rivers in 1970 and the newspaper took its current name Herald Times Reporter in 1973.

References

External links

The Manitowoc Herald Times Reporter

Newspapers published in Wisconsin
Manitowoc County, Wisconsin
Gannett publications